Spain Peak is a peak rising to  on the west side of Deshler Valley in Saint Johns Range, Victoria Land. It was named by the Advisory Committee on Antarctic Names in 2005 after Rae Spain, who from 1979 to 2004 completed 22 field season deployments in various positions held for U.S. Antarctic Project support contractors at the McMurdo, Siple, Palmer, and South Pole Stations, and at remote field camp stations.

References
 

Mountains of Victoria Land
Scott Coast